Pierre Paul de Méredieu, baron de Naillac (born 17 August 1737 Périgueux - 1813)

He was the son of Eymeric Méredieu, lord of Amboise and Elisabeth Vaucocour.

Offices
 Captain of cavalry - Chevalier de Saint-Louis
 Minister of Foreign Affairs of 13 June 1792 to 18 June 1792 in the Government of Louis XVI.

1737 births
1813 deaths
People from Périgueux
French Foreign Ministers